Enrique Alfaro may refer to:

Enrique Alfaro Ramírez (born 1973), Mexican politician.
Enrique Alfaro (footballer) (born 1974), Mexican professional football player.